Islander is a musical conceived by Amy Draper with music and lyrics by Finn Anderson and a book by Stewart Melton. Produced by Helen Milne Productions, the original production premiered on the Isle of Mull and toured the Highlands and Islands of Scotland in 2018. Islander follows the story of a young girl called Eilidh, who is the last child on a remote and increasingly depopulated island. It includes elements of Scottish folklore.

The musical was selected for the Made In Scotland showcase at the Edinburgh Festival Fringe in 2019, where it played in the Paines Plough Roundabout at Summerhall. In October 2019, the production transferred to London's Southwark Playhouse.

The Original Cast Recording was released on 25 September 2020.

In 2021, a screen adaptation of the theatre show was produced by Dundee Repertory Theatre and Eden Court Theatre. The filmed adaptation was screened in Eden Court's cinema, before being available for streaming for a limited time through Dundee Repertory Theatre's streaming platform Rep Studios.

Islander opened Off-Broadway at Playhouse 46 at St Luke's in New York on April 21, 2022, and closed on June 13, 2022.  The production featured the original cast of Bethany Tennick and Kirsty Findlay. The Off-Broadway production is produced by Helen Milne, Molly Morris, Martin Platt and James L Simon, and directed by Amy Draper.

References 

British musicals